Stavros Tsoukalas (born 28 May 1988) is a Greek professional footballer who plays as a midfielder for Super League 2 club Niki Volos.

Career

PAOK
Tsoukalas spend two years loaned to Doxa Dramas and then was immediately loaned again to Cypriot team Nea Salamina. In January 2011 he returned to PAOK. On 14 June 2011, he renewed his contract with the club until 2015. At the start of 2012–13 season he was informed that he was not part of PAOK new coach Giorgos Donis plans. On 7 August 2012, Tsoukalas' contract was mutually terminated.

PAS Giannina
On 8 August 2012 and after the contract termination with PAOK, Tsoukalas agreed to sign a two years contract with PAS Giannina, besides the interest of Greek giants AEK Athens. On 25 August 2012, he made his debut with the club in a 0–0 home draw against Platanias. From this match since 5 December 2014, he played constantly with the club without be injured or expelled in any of those 81 consecutive matches, established a record for the club. He didn't play on 6 December 2014 in the away match against Greek champions Olympiacos, but since then he returned to the starting eleven for the rest of the 2014–15 season.
Tsoukalas started the 2015–16 season as the indisputable leader of PAS Giannina middle line.

Asteras Tripolis
On 24 June 2016, Asteras Tripolis used a buying clause term of €150,000 in order to sign the player for a three-year contract. More specifically, Tsoukalas has the right to buy the remainder of his contract, which is normally completed on 30.6.2017. Meanwhile, PAS Giannina express their dissatisfaction, as they lose one of their best players ahead of the Europa League qualifiers. On 10 January 2018, he solved his contract with the club.

Apollon Smyrnis
On 15 January 2018 and after the contract termination with Asteras Tripolis, Tsoukalas agreed to sign a six months contract with Apollon Smyrnis. On 31 May 2018, he solved his contract with the club.

Kisvárda
On 9 January 2019, he signed a 6-month contract with Hungarian side Kisvárda. At the end of the season, he renewed his contract until the summer of 2021.

Nea Salamina
On 28 December 2020, he signed a 6-month contract with Cypriot side Nea Salamina, in which he had played ten years ago, on loan from PAOK.

Club statistics

Statistics accurate as of 15 May 2021

References

External links
Profile at epae.org

1988 births
Living people
Footballers from Thessaloniki
Greek footballers
Greek expatriate footballers
PAOK FC players
Doxa Drama F.C. players
Nea Salamis Famagusta FC players
PAS Giannina F.C. players
Asteras Tripolis F.C. players
Apollon Smyrnis F.C. players
Kisvárda FC players
Niki Volos F.C. players
Super League Greece players
Gamma Ethniki players
Football League (Greece) players
Cypriot Second Division players
Nemzeti Bajnokság I players
Super League Greece 2 players
Greek expatriate sportspeople in Cyprus
Expatriate footballers in Cyprus
Association football midfielders
Greek expatriate sportspeople in Hungary
Expatriate footballers in Hungary